Çorumspor is a Turkish football club that currently plays in the Regional Amateur League. Çorumspor play at the 15,000-capacity Dr. Turhan Kılıçcıoğlu Stadyumu. In November 2019, Çorum FK started a 3-year takeover process to take over Çorumspor and merge them to one team.

References

External links
Official web site
Çorumspor on TFF page

Football clubs in Turkey
1967 establishments in Turkey
Association football clubs established in 1967